Ludington is an unincorporated community in Richland County, Montana, United States.

Notes

Unincorporated communities in Richland County, Montana
Unincorporated communities in Montana